Live at The El Rey (or Like the Hunted) by Collide, released on December 6, 2005 by Noiseplus Music. A DVD was released a couple weeks on December 20 titled Like the Hunted.

Reception
Prognaut commended the guest musicians' performances, crediting them with granting the music more dimensions.

Track listing

Personnel
Adapted from the Live at The El Rey liner notes.

Collide
 Eric Anest (as Statik) – noises, production, mixing, remixer (16), cover art, photography
 Karin Johnston (as kaRIN) – vocals

Additional performers
 Charlie Clouser – remixer (16)
 Kai Kurosawa – guitar, bass guitar
 Scott Landes – guitar
 Chaz Pease – drums
 Rogerio Silva – guitar

Production and design
 Arturo Everit – photography
 Atratus – photography

Release history

References

External links 
 Live at The El Rey at collide.net
 

Collide (band) albums
2005 live albums